Chugun may refer to:
Chūgun Station, Japan
Chugun, Iran, a village in Zanjan Province, Iran